Mike Hiltner (born March 22, 1966) is an American former professional ice hockey player.

Career
Hiltner played four seasons at the University of Alaska Anchorage, where he was a point per game player, scoring 125 point in 121 games.

Hiltner made his professional debut in 1989, splitting time between the International Hockey League and the newly formed East Coast Hockey League.

Hiltner played the following season in the Finnish SM-liiga with Ilves, where he scored 33 points in 39 games. He returned to the IHL for the 1990–91 season, playing with the Kansas City Blades. Hiltner's totals dropped, where he scored eight goals and thirteen points in forty-four games.

Hiltner started the 1991-92 IHL season, but was later assigned to the Raleigh IceCaps and the Nashville Knights of the ECHL.

He would finish his career in 1993 in Germany, playing with SC Memmingen and later ERSC Amberg.

External links

1966 births
Alaska Anchorage Seawolves men's ice hockey players
American men's ice hockey right wingers
Fort Wayne Komets players
Ilves players
Johnstown Chiefs players
Kalamazoo Wings (1974–2000) players
Kansas City Blades players
Living people
Nashville Knights players
Quebec Nordiques draft picks
Raleigh IceCaps players
National Hockey League supplemental draft picks
Ice hockey players from Minnesota